Krzysztof Ciesielski (born 12 June 1974) is a Polish former road cyclist. Professional from 2000 to 2007, he most notably won the Raiffeisen Grand Prix in 2005 and competed in the road race and time trial at the 2004 UCI Road World Championships.

Major results
1997
 9th Overall Course Cycliste de Solidarnosc et des Champions Olympiques
2000
 8th Overall Circuit des Mines
2004
 2nd Time trial, National Road Championships
 10th Memoriał Henryka Łasaka
2005
 1st Raiffeisen Grand Prix
 3rd Overall Bałtyk–Karkonosze Tour
 7th Puchar Uzdrowisk Karpackich
2006
 4th Memoriał Andrzeja Trochanowskiego

References

External links 

1974 births
Living people
Sportspeople from Kalisz
Polish male cyclists
21st-century Polish people